Barbora Strýcová was the defending champion, but lost in the quarterfinals to Alison Van Uytvanck.

Camila Giorgi won the title, defeating Ekaterina Alexandrova in the final, 6–3, 6–1.

Seeds

Draw

Finals

Top half

Bottom half

Qualifying

Seeds

Qualifiers

Lucky loser
  Kristýna Plíšková

Draw

First qualifier

Second qualifier

Third qualifier

Fourth qualifier

Fifth qualifier

Sixth qualifier

References
 Main draw
 Qualifying draw

Upper Austria Ladies Linz - Singles
Upper Austria Ladies Linz Singles